The 1956 Saskatchewan general election was held on June 20, 1956, to elect members of the Legislative Assembly of Saskatchewan.

The campaign
The Co-operative Commonwealth Federation government of Tommy Douglas lost a significant share of the popular vote, and 6 of the seats it had won in the 1952 election; but retained its majority in the legislature, winning a fourth term in office.

The Liberal Party of Alexander H. McDonald also lost votes, but picked up an additional three seats.

The Social Credit Party of Saskatchewan rebounded from its poor results in previous elections to win over 21% of the popular vote. Because this was spread out across the province, however, the party won only 3 seats in the legislature under the British parliamentary first-past-the-post system.

Results

Percentages

See also
List of political parties in Saskatchewan
List of Saskatchewan provincial electoral districts

Saskatchewan
1956 in Saskatchewan
1956
June 1956 events in Canada